In mathematical optimization, the method of Lagrange multipliers is a strategy for finding the local maxima and minima of a function subject to equality constraints (i.e., subject to the condition that one or more equations have to be satisfied exactly by the chosen values of the variables). It is named after the mathematician Joseph-Louis Lagrange. The basic idea is to convert a constrained problem into a form such that the derivative test of an unconstrained problem can still be applied. The relationship between the gradient of the function and gradients of the constraints rather naturally leads to a reformulation of the original problem, known as the Lagrangian function.

The method can be summarized as follows: In order to find the maximum or minimum of a function  subjected to the equality constraint  form the Lagrangian function,

 and 
or equivalently
 and 

The solution corresponding to the original constrained optimization is always a saddle point of the Lagrangian function, which can be identified among the stationary points from the definiteness of the bordered Hessian matrix.

The great advantage of this method is that it allows the optimization to be solved without explicit parameterization in terms of the constraints. As a result, the method of Lagrange multipliers is widely used to solve challenging constrained optimization problems. Further, the method of Lagrange multipliers is generalized by the Karush–Kuhn–Tucker conditions, which can also take into account inequality constraints of the form  for a given constant

Statement 

The following is known as the Lagrange multiplier theorem.

Let  be an optimal solution to the following optimization problem such that  (here  denotes the matrix of partial derivatives):

Then there exists a unique Lagrange multiplier  such that 

The Lagrange multiplier theorem states that at any local maximum (or minimum) of the function evaluated under the equality constraints, if constraint qualification applies (explained below), then the gradient of the function (at that point) can be expressed as a linear combination of the gradients of the constraints (at that point), with the Lagrange multipliers acting as coefficients. This is equivalent to saying that any direction perpendicular to all gradients of the constraints is also perpendicular to the gradient of the function.

Single constraint 

For the case of only one constraint and only two choice variables (as exemplified in Figure 1), consider the optimization problem

We assume that both  and  have continuous first partial derivatives. We introduce a new variable called a Lagrange multiplier (or Lagrange undetermined multiplier) and study the Lagrange function (or Lagrangian or Lagrangian expression) defined by

where the  term may be either added or subtracted. The assumption  is called constraint qualification. However, not all stationary points yield a solution of the original problem, as the method of Lagrange multipliers yields only a necessary condition for optimality in constrained problems. Sufficient conditions for a minimum or maximum also exist, but if a particular candidate solution satisfies the sufficient conditions, it is only guaranteed that that solution is the best one locally – that is, it is better than any permissible nearby points. The global optimum can be found by comparing the values of the original objective function at the points satisfying the necessary and locally sufficient conditions.

The method of Lagrange multipliers relies on the intuition that at a maximum,  cannot be increasing in the direction of any such neighboring point that also has . If it were, we could walk along  to get higher, meaning that the starting point wasn't actually the maximum.

Suppose we walk along the contour line with  We are interested in finding points where  almost does not change as we walk, since these points might be maxima.

There are two ways this could happen:

Thus we want points  where  and

for some 

where

are the respective gradients. The constant  is required because although the two gradient vectors are parallel, the magnitudes of the gradient vectors are generally not equal. This constant is called the Lagrange multiplier. (In some conventions  is preceded by a minus sign).

To incorporate these conditions into one equation, we introduce an auxiliary function

and solve

Note that this amounts to solving three equations in three unknowns. This is the method of Lagrange multipliers.

To summarize

The method generalizes readily to functions on  variables

which amounts to solving  equations in  unknowns.

One may reformulate the Lagrangian as a Hamiltonian, in which case the solutions are local minima for the Hamiltonian. This is done in optimal control theory, in the form of Pontryagin's minimum principle.

The fact that solutions of the Lagrangian are not necessarily extrema also poses difficulties for numerical optimization. This can be addressed by computing the magnitude of the gradient, as the zeros of the magnitude are necessarily local minima, as illustrated in the numerical optimization example.

Multiple constraints 

The method of Lagrange multipliers can be extended to solve problems with multiple constraints using a similar argument. Consider a paraboloid subject to two line constraints that intersect at a single point. As the only feasible solution, this point is obviously a constrained extremum.

Concretely, suppose we have  constraints and are walking along the set of points satisfying  Every point  on the contour of a given constraint function  has a space of allowable directions: the space of vectors perpendicular to  The set of directions that are allowed by all constraints is thus the space of directions perpendicular to all of the constraints' gradients.

We are still interested in finding points where  does not change as we walk, since these points might be (constrained) extrema. In other words,  Thus there are scalars  such that

 

These scalars are the Lagrange multipliers. We now have  of them, one for every constraint.

As before, we introduce an auxiliary function

 

and solve

which amounts to solving  equations in  unknowns.

The constraint qualification assumption when there are multiple constraints is that the constraint gradients at the relevant point are linearly independent.

Modern formulation via differentiable manifolds

The problem of finding the local maxima and minima subject to constraints can be generalized to finding local maxima and minima on a differentiable manifold  In what follows, it is not necessary that  be a Euclidean space, or even a Riemannian manifold. All appearances of the gradient  (which depends on a choice of Riemannian metric) can be replaced with the exterior derivative

Single constraint

For this it is necessary and sufficient that the following system of  equations holds:

where  denotes the exterior product. The stationary points  are the solutions of the above system of equations plus the constraint  Note that the  equations are not independent, since the left-hand side of the equation belongs to the subvariety of  consisting of decomposable elements.

In this formulation, it is not necessary to explicitly find the Lagrange multiplier, a number  such that

Multiple constraints
Let  and  be as in the above section regarding the case of a single constraint. Let  be the submanifold of  defined by 

Once again, in this formulation it is not necessary to explicitly find the Lagrange multipliers, the numbers  such that

Interpretation of the Lagrange multipliers

Often the Lagrange multipliers have an interpretation as some quantity of interest. For example, by parametrising the constraint's contour line, that is, if the Lagrangian expression is

 

then

So,  is the rate of change of the quantity being optimized as a function of the constraint parameter.
As examples, in Lagrangian mechanics the equations of motion are derived by finding stationary points of the action, the time integral of the difference between kinetic and potential energy.  Thus, the force on a particle due to a scalar potential, can be interpreted as a Lagrange multiplier determining the change in action (transfer of potential to kinetic energy) following a variation in the particle's constrained trajectory.  
In control theory this is formulated instead as costate equations.

Moreover, by the envelope theorem the optimal value of a Lagrange multiplier has an interpretation as the marginal effect of the corresponding constraint constant upon the optimal attainable value of the original objective function: If we denote values at the optimum with a star, then it can be shown that

For example, in economics the optimal profit to a player is calculated subject to a constrained space of actions, where a Lagrange multiplier is the change in the optimal value of the objective function (profit) due to the relaxation of a given constraint (e.g. through a change in income); in such a context  is the marginal cost of the constraint, and is referred to as the shadow price.

Sufficient conditions

Sufficient conditions for a constrained local maximum or minimum can be stated in terms of a sequence of principal minors (determinants of upper-left-justified sub-matrices) of the bordered Hessian matrix of second derivatives of the Lagrangian expression.

Examples

Example 1 

For the method of Lagrange multipliers, the constraint is

hence the Lagrangian function,

Now we can calculate the gradient:

and therefore:

Notice that the last equation is the original constraint.

The first two equations yield

By substituting into the last equation we have:

so

Evaluating the objective function  at these points yields

Example 2 

Example 3 

This example deals with more strenuous calculations, but it is still a single constraint problem.

Suppose one wants to find the maximum values of

with the condition that the - and -coordinates lie on the circle around the origin with radius  That is, subject to the constraint

As there is just a single constraint, there is a single multiplier, say 

The constraint  is identically zero on the circle of radius  Any multiple of  may be added to  leaving  unchanged in the region of interest (on the circle where our original constraint is satisfied).

Applying the ordinary Lagrange multiplier method yields

from which the gradient can be calculated:

And therefore:

(iii) is just the original constraint. (i) implies  or  If  then  by (iii) and consequently   from (ii). If  substituting this into (ii) yields  Substituting this into (iii) and solving for  gives  Thus there are six critical points of 

Evaluating the objective at these points, one finds that

Note that while  is a critical point of  it is not a local extremum of  We have

Given any neighbourhood of  one can choose a small positive  and a small  of either sign to get  values both greater and less than  This can also be seen from the Hessian matrix of  evaluated at this point (or indeed at any of the critical points) which is an indefinite matrix.

Example 4 

Suppose we wish to find the discrete probability distribution on the points  with maximal information entropy. This is the same as saying that we wish to find the least structured probability distribution on the points  In other words, we wish to maximize the Shannon entropy equation:

For this to be a probability distribution the sum of the probabilities  at each point  must equal 1, so our constraint is:

which gives a system of  equations,  such that:

Carrying out the differentiation of these  equations, we get

This shows that all  are equal (because they depend on  only). By using the constraint

we find

Hence, the uniform distribution is the distribution with the greatest entropy, among distributions on  points.

Example 5 

The critical points of Lagrangians occur at saddle points, rather than at local maxima (or minima). Unfortunately, many numerical optimization techniques, such as hill climbing, gradient descent, some of the quasi-Newton methods, among others, are designed to find local maxima (or minima) and not saddle points. For this reason, one must either modify the formulation to ensure that it's a minimization problem (for example, by extremizing the square of the gradient of the Lagrangian as below), or else use an optimization technique that finds stationary points (such as Newton's method without an extremum seeking line search) and not necessarily extrema.

As a simple example, consider the problem of finding the value of  that minimizes  constrained such that  (This problem is somewhat untypical because there are only two values that satisfy this constraint, but it is useful for illustration purposes because the corresponding unconstrained function can be visualized in three dimensions.)

Using Lagrange multipliers, this problem can be converted into an unconstrained optimization problem:

In order to solve this problem with a numerical optimization technique, we must first transform this problem such that the critical points occur at local minima. This is done by computing the magnitude of the gradient of the unconstrained optimization problem.

First, we compute the partial derivative of the unconstrained problem with respect to each variable:

If the target function is not easily differentiable, the differential with respect to each variable can be approximated as

 

where  is a small value.

Next, we compute the magnitude of the gradient, which is the square root of the sum of the squares of the partial derivatives:

 

(Since magnitude is always non-negative, optimizing over the squared-magnitude is equivalent to optimizing over the magnitude. Thus, the "square root" may be omitted from these equations with no expected difference in the results of optimization.)

Applications

Control theory
In optimal control theory, the Lagrange multipliers are interpreted as costate variables, and Lagrange multipliers are reformulated as the minimization of the Hamiltonian, in Pontryagin's minimum principle.

Nonlinear programming
The Lagrange multiplier method has several generalizations. In nonlinear programming there are several multiplier rules, e.g. the Carathéodory–John Multiplier Rule and the Convex Multiplier Rule, for inequality constraints.

Power systems
Methods based on Lagrange multipliers have applications in power systems, e.g. in distributed-energy-resources (DER) placement and load shedding.

See also

 Adjustment of observations
 Duality
 Gittins index
 Karush–Kuhn–Tucker conditions: generalization of the method of Lagrange multipliers
 Lagrange multipliers on Banach spaces: another generalization of the method of Lagrange multipliers
 Lagrange multiplier test in maximum likelihood estimation
 Lagrangian relaxation

References

Further reading

External links

 
  — plus a brief discussion of Lagrange multipliers in the calculus of variations as used in physics.
 

 
 
  — Provides compelling insight in 2 dimensions that at a minimizing point, the direction of steepest descent must be perpendicular to the tangent of the constraint curve at that point.
 
 
  — Course slides accompanying text on nonlinear optimization
  — Geometric idea behind Lagrange multipliers
 

Multivariable calculus
Mathematical optimization
Mathematical and quantitative methods (economics)